This is a list of Calgary Transit bus routes and routes of Calgary Region transit authorities that serve destinations within Calgary's city limits.

Standard Bus Routes

Express Buses 
Express routes, are peak-hour services that run in one direction in the morning and in the reverse direction in the afternoon.  Historically, express bus stops are denoted with a red sign, but the use has been abandoned since 2000 in favor of a unified scheme.

BRT and MAX 

Calgary Transit's BRT routes has very few features of a modern bus rapid transit system, with limited stop service and signal priority being implemented (originally, the use of articulated buses was also a feature, but the use has spread to some high-volume local express routes).  BRT in Calgary is meant to be a placeholder for soon-to-be-constructed LRT routes.  BRT routes stop only at designated stops with red shelters.

Passengers from Calgary International Airport on Route 300 must have an Airport Boarding Pass (which also acts as a day pass), sold at the airport terminal for $11.25. The Calgary Transit Boarding Pass is not required for passengers using day passes, monthly passes, seniors passes, transfers from Route 100 bus, or Upasses. This route uses 2013-2014 New Flyers fitted with luggage racks at the front of the bus. On Nov 19, 2018, Calgary Transit introduced 3 new MAX routes. MAX has shelters with heat, light, and doors. A fourth MAX route was introduced on December 23, 2019.

School Service 
These routes, meant for high school students, service various schools en route on school days only.  School Service is not a chartered service, and is available for travel by any fare-paid passenger.  Services stop at all Calgary Transit bus stops along the intended service area, beyond which service continues nonstop to the school.

See also
Transportation in Calgary

References

External links
Calgary Transit Route Maps in Google Maps

Bus routes
bus routes
Calgary